GENA stands for General Event Notification Architecture.

GENA Base defines an HTTP notification architecture that transmits notifications between  HTTP resources. An HTTP resource could be any object which might need to send or receive a notification, for example a distribution list, buddy list, print job, etc. It was defined in Internet Draft draft-cohen-gena-p-base-01.txt (now expired).

GENA Base Client to Arbiter provides for the ability to send and receive notifications using HTTP over TCP/IP and administratively scoped unreliable multicast UDP. Provisions are made for the use of intermediary arbiters, called subscription arbiters, which handle routing notifications to their intended destination.

History

During July 13–14, 1998 the University of California Irvine convened WISEN: the Workshop on Internet-Scale Event Notification. This event brought together a number of experts of various fields and included a presentation on GENA by Josh Cohen of Microsoft. Delegates showcased their event notification architectures and haggled over requirements of the same. Josh's final slide includes the bullet points "GENA is being implemented by Microsoft Products" and "Our wish is to collaborate to agree on a standard. GENA or other, we will comply."

Interest in event notification appears to have waned after 1998 as participants were unable to come to common definitions of what is required for the definition of notification services and protocols. GENA was briefly considered for use in the Internet Printing Protocol but found a niche as part of the Universal Plug and Play (UPnP) architecture.

Internet Drafts
GENA Base
 July 9, 1998

Client to Arbiter
 June 24, 1999
 September 6, 2000

See also
Notification system for details on generic message relaying systems
Virtual synchrony to learn about how event notification systems can offer stronger ordering and fault-tolerance properties.

External links
WISEN

References

Internet protocols